Vallen is a surname. Notable people with the surname include: 

Mark Vallen (born 1953), American activist, artist, and blogger
Ricky Vallen (born 1978), Brazilian singer
Via Vallen

Cinema
Vallen (film), a 2001 film

See also
Vallen Castle, castle in Sweden